Lavon is a city in Collin County and has been one of the U.S. state of Texas's fastest-growing communities, with a 2000 census-tabulated population of 387 and 2020 tabulated population of 4,469.

Geography

Texas State Highway 78 passes through Lavon, leading north  to Farmersville and southwest  to Garland. Texas State Highway 205 departs from Highway 78 on the west side of Lavon and leads south  to Rockwall.

Demographics

At the census of 2000, 387 people, 136 households, and 116 families were residing in the town. At the 2020 census, its population grew to 4,469. Part of the Metroplex, its population increase is attributed to the rapid influx of residents from other U.S. states and countries.

In 2020, there were 1,500 housing units; of the total housing units, 80 were vacant. Among the households and families in the city, the average family size was 3.38 and 19.7% were non-married households in 2019.

Of its population from 2000 to 2020, the majority have been non-Hispanic or Latino white Americans. Black and African Americans have remained the second largest racial and ethnic group within the city with Hispanic and Latino Americans.

The 2019 American Community Survey determined the median household income was $89,474. Married-couple families had a median household income of $95,558, non-married families $96,010, and non-family households $51,625. In 2000, the median income for a household was $57,083, and for a family was $61,250. Males had a median income of $42,143 versus $31,250 for females. The per capita income for the town was $20,711. None of the families and 1.3% of the population were living below the poverty line, including no one under 18 and 10.5% of those over 64.

Education
Lavon is served by the Community Independent School District.

References

External links
 City of Lavon official website
 The Wylie News, newspaper of record for Lavon

Dallas–Fort Worth metroplex
Cities in Collin County, Texas
Cities in Texas